is a railway station in the city of Ama, Aichi Prefecture, Japan , operated by Meitetsu.

Lines

Station layout
The station has a two opposed side platforms connected by a footbridge. The platforms are not even: the platform for trains in the direction of Nagoya is longer, and can accommodate trains of eight carriages in length, whereas the opposing platform is shorter, and can accommodate trains of only up to six carriages. The station is staffed.

Platforms

Adjacent stations

|-
!colspan=5|Nagoya Railroad

Station history
Jimokuji Station was opened on January 23, 1914.

Surrounding area
Jimoku-ji
former Jimokuji town hall

See also
 List of Railway Stations in Japan

External links

 Official web page 

Railway stations in Japan opened in 1914
Railway stations in Aichi Prefecture
Stations of Nagoya Railroad
Ama, Aichi